Drybin District (Drybinsky raion) is a raion (district) in Mogilev Region, Belarus, the administrative center is the urban-type settlement of Drybin. As of 2009, its population was 12,253. Population of Drybin accounts for 26.9% of the district's population.

References

 
Districts of Mogilev Region